Erhard Ratdolt (1442–1528) was an early German printer from Augsburg. He was active as a printer in Venice from 1476 to 1486, and afterwards in Augsburg.  From 1475 to 1478 he was in partnership with two other German printers.

The first book the partnership produced was the Calendarium (1476), written and previously published by Regiomontanus, which offered one of the earliest examples of a modern title page. Other noteworthy publications are the Historia Romana of Appianus (1477), and the first edition of Euclid's Elements (1482), where he solved the problem of printing geometric diagrams, the Poeticon astronomicon, also from 1482, Haly Abenragel (1485), and Alchabitius (1503). Ratdolt is also famous for having produced the first known printer's type specimen book (in this instance a broadsheet displaying the fonts with which he might print).

His innovations of layout and typography, mixing type and woodcuts, have subsequently been much admired. His graphic choices and technical solutions influenced also those of William Morris.

References

External links

Prints & People: A Social History of Printed Pictures, an exhibition catalog from The Metropolitan Museum of Art (fully available online as PDF), which contains material on Ratdolt (see index)
Erhard Ratdolt - first publisher of Euclid
G. R. Redgrave: Erhard Ratdolt and his work at Venice. London, 1894

1442 births
1528 deaths
German printers
Medieval German merchants
16th-century German businesspeople
15th-century German businesspeople